Tatla Lake  is a small unincorporated community in the west Chilcotin area of British Columbia, Canada, located at the west end of its eponymous lake. Situated 220 km west of Williams Lake along Highway 20 (Chilcotin Highway), Tatla Lake's 123 people live approximately halfway between the two ends of the highway; Williams Lake to the east and the coastal community of Bella Coola to the west. The community is the service centre for three major mountain valleys of West Branch, Chilko and Tatlayoko. These valleys extend southward via secondary roads.

History
The first people to live in Tatla Lake were the Tsilhqot'in (Chilcotin) First Nations people. Ranching began in 1890 with the advent of early pioneers. Robert Graham arrived in the country in 1901 and purchased the Tatla Lake place from Benny Franklin in 1902. The Grahams built a fine new house as well as a new store in 1930. The house is now the Graham Inn, long known for serving excellent meals to hungry travelers on the highway. A post office was established on the Graham Ranch in 1914 with Mrs. Graham as postmistress for mail that only came once a month at first. The Grahams' son William, was the first baby born in the new log hospital at Alexis Creek in 1915. Over the years a school, community hall, and nursing station were added.

An abandoned aerodrome, or airport, is situated a few hundred metres north of the settlement, with intersecting, paved runways of about 3500 and 4000 feet in length, judging by satellite maps. The more east-west runway appears to be in use as part of a roadway. This aerodrome, when it was active, may have existed as a staging area for aircraft being ferried from the continental United States to Alaska as part of the Second World War.

Geography
Tatla Lake is situated on the western edge of the Chilcotin Plateau, and some of the largest mountains in British Columbia are found to the west including Mount Waddington - the tallest mountain completely within British Columbia's border. The Coast Mountains block most of the moisture traveling off the Pacific Ocean leaving the entire Chilcotin region in a rain shadow. Tatla Lake is the westernmost location for many semi-arid plants like Prickly Pear Cactus and Rabbit Brush.

Climate
Tatla Lake has a continental mediterranean climate (Köppen climate classification: Dsb), closely bordering on a subalpine  mediterranean climate (Köppen climate classification: Dsc). The rain shadow effect means Tatla Lake is quite dry receiving about the same precipitation per year as Penticton. The dry air combined with relatively high elevation and clear skies mean the daily temperature extremes are rather wide. In September the temperature can be over 32°C (90°F) during the day and below freezing at night. On average the temperature fluctuates by about 17 °C (31°F).

During the winter the Tatla Lake valley is much colder than the surrounding plateau and valleys as the cold air sinks creating strong temperature inversions. The nearby weather station at Puntzi recorded a low of -52.8°C (-63°F) on December 29, 1968. During the winters chinook winds blow up the coastal valleys, but often pass over Tatla Lake leaving the community in a deep freeze. This occurs because the Tatla Lake drainage system flows east, while the neighbouring valleys flow west through the Coast Mountains.

See also
Tatla Lake
Chilanko Forks

References

Populated places in the Chilcotin
Unincorporated settlements in British Columbia